Antonino Orrú (23 April 1928 – 13 August 2022) was an Italian Roman Catholic prelate.

Orrú was born in Italy and was ordained to the priesthood in 1952. He served as bishop of the Roman Catholic Diocese of Ales-Terralba, Italy from 1990 until his retirement in 2004. He died on 13 August 2022, at the age of 94.

References

1928 births
2022 deaths
Italian Roman Catholic bishops
Bishops appointed by Pope John Paul II
People from the Province of Oristano